La Giudecca  was a term used In Southern Italy and Sicily to identify any urban district (or a portion of a village) where Jewish communities dwelled and had their synagogues and businesses.

Unlike the compulsory ghettos of Northern Italy and elsewhere, in some Southern Italian hamlets and cities Jewish families and their members voluntarily chose to live in certain areas but were free to travel and even contribute together with their Christian neighbours to the success or commercial, cultural and artistic progress of a region. A very few Sicilian Giudeccas were unhealthy and declined, in fact, the majority included many craftsmen, doctors and tradesmen.

Etymology
Judeca and Giudecca are the corrupt or jargonized medieval versions of the Latin female adjective Judaica, meaning Jewish or Judaean. The Jewess or The Jewry are other plausible meanings.

It is not known why the Venetian island of Giudecca acquired that name, as there is no evidence of Jewish settlement there.

The word Giudecca is also used in Dante's Inferno for the lowest circle of Hell, in which Judas (Giuda) resides.

Jewish neighbourhoods in Southern Italy

Some names and their meanings

Notes and references 

Sicilia Judaica, N. Bucaria. Flaccovio Editore (1996).

Jews and Judaism in Italy
Jewish Italian history
Jewish communities